Nailea Norvind (born 16 February 1970) is a Mexican theater, television and film actress.

She is best known for her role as Leonor in the telenovela Quinceañera, as well as appeared in the critically acclaimed 1987 film Gaby: A True Story. She was nominated for the Ariel Award for Best Supporting Actress in 2012 for her role as Nina in the film La Otra Familia.

Biography 
Nailea Norvind is the daughter of Norwegian-born counselor, dominatrix, writer, producer, director and former actress Eva Norvind, who was in turn the daughter of a Russian prince, Paulovic Chegodayef Sakonsky, and a Finnish sculptor, Johanna Kajanus. Norvind became estranged from her mother when she was 12; they were reunited to search for her unknown Dutch father on the Dutch program Spoorloos on 2 February 2004. Norvind has two daughters of her own: Naian and Tessa Ía González Norvind, the latter appearing at 17 years of age in her first film Después de Lucía, a 2012 Mexican film by Michel Franco.

Norvind began her acting career at the age of 6 in a theatre production of Henrik Ibsen's A Doll's House, and in television on the telenovela Chispita. Norvind's break came in at the age of 17 in 1987 with the role of Leonor Gutiérrez on the El Canal de las Estrellas telenovela Quinceañera. The same year, she participated in the film Gaby: A True Story. After a few small roles in several other telenovelas, she starred in Cuando llega el amor and then took a break from television. She returned eight years later in the telenovela Preciosa. She also appeared as herself in Didn't Do It for Love, a documentary about her mother directed by Monika Treut.

In 2006, Norvind completed the film that her mother had been directing and producing at the time of her death in May of that same year, titled Born Without, a documentary about severely handicapped Mexican actor and musician Jose Flores, who was born without arms and other limbs, yet supports his large family by playing the harmonica at various venues throughout Mexico.

Norvind is openly bisexual.

Filmography

Film

Television

References

External links 
 

1970 births
Living people
Mexican child actresses
Mexican telenovela actresses
Mexican television actresses
Mexican film actresses
20th-century Mexican actresses
21st-century Mexican actresses
Actresses from Mexico City
Mexican people of Norwegian descent
Mexican people of Russian descent
Mexican people of Finnish descent
Mexican people of Dutch descent
People from Mexico City
Norvind family
Bisexual actresses
Mexican LGBT actors